Bilylivka is a village in the Berdychiv raion, Zhytomyr oblast in Ukraine. Its population is 2,193.

History 
On the eve of the war, there were over 1800 Jews living in the village. The Germans captured the town on 15 July 1941. On September 10, 1941, over 850 Jews were murdered by mobile SS units, aided by local police in a mass execution.

References 

Holocaust locations in Ukraine

Berdichevsky Uyezd
Villages in Berdychiv Raion